Charles Kenneth "Buddy" Nix (born December 6, 1939) is a former American football coach and executive.  He was the general manager of the Buffalo Bills of the National Football League (NFL) from 2009 to 2013. Nix was a scout for the Bills from 1993 to 2000. He joined John Butler and A. J. Smith with the San Diego Chargers from 2001 to 2008 and returned to the Bills in 2009.

Early years
Nix was born in Carbon Hill, Alabama, where he later attended Talladega High School and played linebacker. Nix attended Livingston University (now the University of West Alabama) in Livingston, Alabama, playing fullback on its football team.

Coaching career
Nix was head coach at Eufaula High School in Eufaula, Alabama, leading the Tigers to their first Border Conference championship in 1966.

Chattanooga
Nix had a successful college football coaching career at the University of Tennessee at Chattanooga. He was responsible for recruiting star wide receiver Terrell Owens.

Administrative career

Buffalo Bills
Nix was a regional scout under John Butler from 1993 to 2000 for the Buffalo Bills, specializing in the Southeastern United States.

San Diego Chargers
Nix left Buffalo with Butler and A. J. Smith after the 2000 season. He was initially the Director of Pro Player Personnel (2000–2001), but after Butler died, Smith was promoted to general manager, and Nix to assistant general manager.

Nix's job with the San Diego Chargers was to oversee both professional and college scouting and to be one of the main decision makers in each NFL Draft. Nix was a major reason the Chargers turned around from a losing football team to a rebuilt, winning team. In 2004, three players Nix drafted were selected to the 2005 Pro Bowl. In 2005, six players Nix drafted were selected to the 2006 Pro Bowl. In 2006, eleven players Nix drafted were selected to the 2007 Pro Bowl. In 2007, eight players Nix drafted were selected to the 2008 Pro Bowl.

The Chargers won four of the last five AFC West titles with Nix as Assistant GM and Director of Player Personnel, in charge of college scouting and instrumental to the decision making process of their NFL drafts.

Buffalo Bills
Nix was hired as a National Scout for the Buffalo Bills on January 26, 2009. He was named General Manager of the Buffalo Bills on December 31, 2009, after Russ Brandon was promoted to CEO.

He extended the contract of running back Fred Jackson before Jackson was allowed to hit free agency. He also extended quarterback Ryan Fitzpatrick's contract. This cleared the way for him to work to re-sign wide receiver Stevie Johnson once he hit free agency and then work to improve his defense by adding Mario Williams.

On May 13, 2013 the Bills announced that Nix would step away from his role as GM and transition to special assistant.

Personal life
Nix has three children: Steve (wife: Sherry) and Stan (wife: Holli), and Stacey (husband: Alan). Nix also has six grandchildren: Hope, Ana, Tyler, Dakota, Sawyer and Tucker, and he has three step-grandchildren: Macaela, Haydn, and Jake. He is the great-grandfather to Lara Kate, Olivia, Ahlani, MJ, Lykan, late great granddaughter Lainee, and Roman.

His wife is Diann Abernathy of Lafayette, Alabama.

Head coaching record

College

References

1939 births
Living people
American football fullbacks
American football linebackers
Auburn Tigers football coaches
Buffalo Bills executives
Buffalo Bills scouts
Carson–Newman Eagles football coaches
Chattanooga Mocs football coaches
LSU Tigers football coaches
San Diego Chargers executives
Southern Miss Golden Eagles football coaches
West Alabama Tigers football coaches
West Alabama Tigers football players
National Football League general managers
High school football coaches in Alabama
High school football coaches in Georgia (U.S. state)
People from Carbon Hill, Alabama
Players of American football from Alabama